Zbysław Zając (9 September 1933 – 7 January 1985) was a Polish cyclist. He competed in the men's sprint at the 1964 Summer Olympics.

References

1933 births
1985 deaths
Polish male cyclists
Olympic cyclists of Poland
Cyclists at the 1964 Summer Olympics
People from Radomsko County
Sportspeople from Łódź Voivodeship